Stigmella rhamnicola is a moth of the family Nepticulidae. It is found in Ohio, United States.

The wingspan is 4.2–5 mm for the summer generation and 4.4-5.6 for the winter generation. Mines have been collected in early July and October and are most abundant in October. There are two to three generations per year.

The larvae feed on Rhamnus lanceolata. They mine the leaves of their host plant. The mine is much contorted and linear at first. Later, the mine lengthens and straightens, crossing to the upper surface and broadening markedly. The frass is deposited as a continuous black line initially, but becomes a granular arcuate (curved) line in later stages.

External links
Nepticulidae of North America
A taxonomic revision of the North American species of Stigmella (Lepidoptera: Nepticulidae)

Nepticulidae
Moths of North America
Moths described in 1916